Netaji Nagar Day College is an undergraduate and postgraduate liberal science, arts and commerce college in Kolkata, India. It is affiliated with the University of Calcutta.

Departments

Science

Chemistry
Physics
Mathematics
Botany
Zoology
Physiology
Computer Science
Electronics
Environmental Science

Arts

Bengali
English
History
Geography
Political Science
Philosophy
Economics
Education

Commerce (U.G)

Accounting and Finance
Marketing

Commerce (P.G)

Accounting and Finance

Accreditation
Netaji Nagar Day College is recognized by the University Grants Commission (UGC). Recently, it has been awarded B++ grade by the National Assessment and Accreditation Council (NAAC).

Notable alumni
Rajatava Dutta, actor 
Tramila Bhattacharya, actress

See also 
Education in India
Education in West Bengal
Netaji Nagar College
Netaji Nagar College for Women
Netaji Nagar, Kolkata
List of colleges affiliated to the University of Calcutta

References

External links

University of Calcutta affiliates
Educational institutions established in 1967
1967 establishments in West Bengal